The  is a Japanese magical girl anime franchise created by Izumi Todo and Bandai and produced by Asahi Broadcasting Corporation, Asatsu-DK, Toei Animation and Bandai. Each series revolves around a group of magical girls known as Pretty Cures who battle against evil forces. Starting in February 2004 with Futari wa Pretty Cure, the franchise has seen many anime series, spanning over 850 episodes to date, as well as spawning movies, manga, toys, and video games. Its most recent iteration, Soaring Sky! Pretty Cure, began airing in February 2023 as part of TV Asahi's Sunday morning children's television block. As of December 2022, three series have received English adaptations.

Overview
Each series focuses on a group of teenage girls who are granted special items that allow them to transform into legendary warriors known as the Pretty Cure. With the assistance of creatures known as fairies, the Pretty Cure use their magical powers and enhanced strength to fight against evil forces who create monsters to bring misery to the Earth. As the series progresses and stronger enemies appear, the Cures gain new magical items, new abilities, and sometimes new allies to help them in their fight against evil.

Main series
There are currently twenty anime television series in the franchise, two of which are direct sequels to their previous series. To date, three of the series have received English adaptations. Futari wa Pretty Cure was dubbed into English by Ocean Productions and aired in Canada under the name Pretty Cure. Smile PreCure! and DokiDoki! PreCure were adapted by Saban Brands and released on Netflix under the names Glitter Force and Glitter Force Doki Doki, respectively. The series, Kirakira Pretty Cure a la Mode, Healin' Good Pretty Cure and Tropical-Rouge! Pretty Cure, began streaming in Crunchyroll on their respective territories. Each series has received a manga adaptation illustrated by Futago Kamikita, which is published in Kodansha's Nakayoshi shoujo magazine alongside the anime. Starting with Fresh Pretty Cure!, each ending movie featured a dance choreography by each series' Pretty Cure members.

As of 2020, Toei Animation Inc. owns the international rights to the franchise while both the dubs of Smile and DokiDoki alongside the Glitter Force brand is currently owned by Hasbro and eOne.

Films

Beginning with Futari wa Pretty Cure Max Heart, each television series has received a theatrical animated film based on the series, with Max Heart receiving two films. Starting in March 2009, crossover films featuring characters from multiple series have been released annually, with 12 crossover films released to date. The eleventh crossover film, Hugtto! PreCure Futari wa Pretty Cure: All Stars Memories, has been awarded the Guinness World Records title for "Most Magical Warriors in an Anime Film", with a total number of 55 Cures with speaking roles.

Adaptations

Video games
Several video games have been produced by Bandai Namco Entertainment (formerly Bandai) for video game systems and educational consoles, as well as Data Carddass arcade machines.

Console video games
 (2004, Game Boy Advance)
 (2005, Game Boy Advance)
 (2005, Nintendo DS)
 (2006, Nintendo DS)
 (2007, Nintendo DS)
 (2008, Nintendo DS)
 (2009, Nintendo DS)
 (2010, Nintendo DS)
 (2010, Nintendo DS)
 (2011, Nintendo DS)
 (2012, Nintendo 3DS)
 (2013, Wii)
 (2013, Nintendo 3DS)
 (2014, Nintendo 3DS)
 (2015, Nintendo 3DS)
 (2017-2020, iOS, Android) 
 (2018, Nintendo Switch)

Arcade game
 (2007–2017)

Educational titles
 (2004, Sega Pico)
 (2005, Beena)
 (2006, Beena)
 (2008, Beena)
 (2009, Beena)
 (2010, Beena)
 (2011, Beena)

Live-action drama

A live-action series, aired in Japan between April and June 2018, celebrating the franchise's 15th anniversary. The series follows a group of aspiring voice actresses and stars Haruka Fukuhara, who voiced Himari Arisugawa/Cure Custard in Kirakira PreCure a la Mode.

Reception
The combination of transmedia text products, including anime series, films, live performances, theme stores, and toys, has been analyzed as a "system of consumption, knowledge and action [that] creates a lifestyle-text, a set of fictional media works that are synonymous with the lifestyle practices they promote."

The Pretty Cure films are the seventh highest-grossing anime film franchise.

Merchandise
Pretty Cure has had numerous licensed merchandise sold in Japan. By 2010, it became Japan's fifth highest-grossing franchise annually.

References

Further reading

External links

 PreCure TV Asahi official website 
 PreCure Toei official website 

 
Bandai brands
Magical girl anime and manga
Mass media franchises introduced in 2004
Teen superhero television series
Children's manga